Journey is the second album released by record producer Arif Mardin as leader. Released on the Atlantic label in 1974, it features "a veritable who's who of funk and jazz greats", many of them regular session and studio musicians who appear on Mardin-produced albums for other artists.

Track listing
All tracks written by Arif Mardin.
 "Street Scene: Strollin'" 
 "Street Scene: Dark Alleys"
 "Street Scene: Love on a Rainy Afternoon"
 "Street Scene: Parade"
 "A Sunday Afternoon Feeling"
 "Journey: Journey"
 "Journey: Flight"
 "Forms"

Personnel
Arif Mardin – percussion, piano, electric piano
Pepper Adams – baritone saxophone 
Kenneth Bichel – synthesizer, electric piano
Alex Blake – bass
Phil Bodner – oboe, alto saxophone
Michael Brecker – tenor saxophone
Randy Brecker – trumpet, flugelhorn
Barnett Brown - trombone
Garnett Brown – trombone
James Buffington – French horn
Gary Burton – vibraphone
Don Butterfield – tuba
Ron Carter – bass
Urszula Dudziak – vocals
Billy Cobham – drums
Cornell Dupree – guitar
George Devens – percussion
Gordon Edwards – bass
Joe Farrell – oboe, tenor saxophone, soprano saxophone 
Jerry Friedman – guitar
Steve Gadd - drums
Armen Halburian – percussion
Hubert Laws – flute
Milcho Leviev – clarinet
Tony Levin – bass
Mel Davis – trumpet
Ralph MacDonald – percussion
David "Fathead" Newman – alto saxophone
Gene Orloff – violin
Romeo Penque – baritone saxophone
Seldon Powell – tenor saxophone 
Bernard Purdie – drums
Pat Rebillot – electric piano, clavinet
George Ricci – cello
Billy Slapin – woodwind
Todd Sommer – percussion
David Spinozza – guitar
Marvin Stamm – trumpet
Tony Studd – trombone
Grady Tate – drums
Richard Tee – electric piano
Michal Urbaniak – violin
Frank Wess – alto saxophone

References

1974 albums
Albums produced by Arif Mardin
Atlantic Records albums